Factory Boss is a 2014 Chinese film directed by Zhang Wei. It was released in China on October 21, 2014.

Cast
Yao Anlian
Tang Yan
Zhao Ju
Huang Jingyi

Film Festival

38th Montreal World Film Festival
Awarded Best Actor
33rd Fajr International Film Festival
Awarded Best Original Screenplay
May 2, 2015

8th Bangaluru Intl Film Festival-2016
February 4, 2016
Bangaluru, India
Screening

Asia House Film Festival
February 26, 2016
London, United Kingdom
Screening

Beijing International Film Festival
April 22, 2016
Beijing, China
Screening

San Jose Cinequest Film Festival
San Jose, USA
Screening

Asian American International Film Festival
July 23 - Aug 1st, 2015
New York, USA
Audience Award (Narrative Feature)

Cleveland International Film Festival
March 19–21, 2015
Cleveland, USA
Screening

References

External links

https://www.latimes.com/world/la-fg-c1-china-factory-boss-20140903-story.html
https://variety.com/2014/film/reviews/film-review-factory-boss-1201300789#u=https://variety.com/2014/film/reviews/film-review-factory-boss-1201300789;k=pmc-adi-31bb2464aad8b905af7a81e1d57b77ae
http://www.frontrowreviews.co.uk/reviews/asia-house-film-festival-factory-boss/37856
http://magazyn.o.pl/2016/zhang-wei-alexandra-holownia-factory-boss-czyli-krytyka-globalnej-ekonomii/#/
http://newsvideo.su/video/3522139

Chinese drama films